Robert Gene "Red" West (March 8, 1936 – July 18, 2017) was an American actor, film stuntman and songwriter. He was known for being a close confidant and bodyguard for rock and roll singer Elvis Presley. Upon his firing, West wrote the controversial Elvis: What Happened?, in which he exposed the singer's dangerous drug dependence in an attempt to save him.

West was probably best known to American film audiences for his role as Red in Road House, alongside Patrick Swayze. West appeared to critical acclaim in the 2008 independent film Goodbye Solo as William.

Early life
West was born in Memphis, Tennessee, to Lois and Newton Thomas West. West was the cousin of actor 'Sonny' West. While attending high school in Tennessee, West and Sonny met Elvis Presley.

An excellent athlete and U.S. Marine, West played football for his high school and junior college at Jones County Junior College teams and was a boxer in the Golden Gloves championships.

In 1961, West married his wife Pat Boyd. Together, they had two children.

West and Presley

Songwriting career
West collaborated with Elvis Presley two songs in 1961 and 1962, which Elvis got a token credit on, "That's Someone You Never Forget" and "You'll Be Gone".

"That's Someone You Never Forget" is the final track on the 1962 album Pot Luck. The song was released as a 45-rpm B-side single in 1967 and features on the Artist of the Century compilation. "You'll Be Gone" is a bonus track on the Girl Happy soundtrack LP. West co-wrote "If You Think I Don't Need You" with Joey Cooper for the motion picture Viva Las Vegas. He teamed up with Joey Cooper again on "I'm A Fool", which Ricky Nelson recorded, and which was later a hit for Dino, Desi and Billy (the partnership of Dean-Paul "Dino" Martin, Desi Arnaz Jr., and William "Billy" Hinsche).

West co wrote the song "Separate Ways" with Richard Mainegra for Elvis in 1972, and "If You Talk in Your Sleep" with Johnny Christopher for Presley's 1975 album Promised Land. Red wrote "If Every Day Was Like Christmas", recorded by Presley in 1966.

In addition to writing for Elvis, Red had songs recorded by Pat Boone, Rick Nelson, Johnny Burnette, Johnny Rivers, Dino, Desi & Billy, Petula Clark, Gary Puckett & The Union Gap, Andre Kostelanetz and His Orchestra, and Little Milton, among others.

Elvis' entourage and firing
In 1976, West was criticized in the media for his involvement in a series of heavy-handed incidents with aggressive fans in Las Vegas. He was also becoming vocal about Presley needing help for his drug problem. Elvis's father, Vernon Presley, who hated the members of his son's entourage, fired  West, his cousin Sonny, and bodyguard David Hebler.

The three subsequently wrote the book Elvis: What Happened?, claiming to be an attempt to warn and obtain help for Elvis. Some suspected it was a retaliatory money-making exercise, but with Elvis' death within weeks of publication the book's claims proved accurate. Presley had offered the publisher $1,000,000 to stop printing the book.

Acting career
When Presley was making films in the 1960s in Hollywood, Red West appeared in small roles in sixteen of the star's films. During this time, West became good friends with actor Nick Adams and his physical abilities got him hired on as a stuntman on Adams' television series, The Rebel. From there, West went on to do more stunt work in film as well as developing a career as an actor in a number of motion pictures and on television. He was often on screen as a henchman in the television series The Wild Wild West.

West also played the role of Sheriff Tanner of Alcorn County, Mississippi in the 1973 film Walking Tall. He also reprised the role in the 1975 film Walking Tall Part 2.

West also played the ornery, sometimes violent Master Sergeant Andy Micklin on Baa Baa Black Sheep. He guest starred twice on the CBS hit detective series Magnum, P.I. as different characters, as five different ones on The A-Team, the Knight Rider pilot episode "Knight of the Phoenix", on The Fall Guy, Simon & Simon and in "The Once and Future King", an episode of The Twilight Zone which concerned Presley..]In 1989 West appeared in the action film Road House with Patrick Swayze as Red Webster, the auto parts store owner.

West played the lead role in the 2008 independent film Goodbye Solo as William, an elderly depressed man who befriends a Senegalese man in Winston-Salem, North Carolina. The film received positive reviews and critic Roger Ebert remarked that "West isn't playing himself, but he evokes his character so fully that he might as well be. West's face is a map of hard living".

His last film role was in the 2013 film Safe Haven as Roger, an elderly store clerk in Southport, North Carolina.

Death
West died on July 18, 2017, aged 81, from an aortic aneurysm, at Baptist Memorial Hospital in his native Memphis.

His death occurred less than two months after the death of his cousin, actor Sonny West, in May 2017. His funeral and burial at Memorial Park Cemetery  was held on July 24 in Memphis.

In popular culture
In John Carpenter's 1979 film Elvis, West was portrayed by Robert Gray. West was also portrayed by his son John Boyd West in the 2005 Golden Globe winning CBS mini-series Elvis and in the 21st episode of the fifth season of Quantum Leap, Memphis Melody.

Selected filmography

Journey to the Center of the Earth (1959) - Bearded Man at Newspaper Stand / University Student (uncredited)
Ice Palace (1960) - Train Passenger (uncredited)
Flaming Star (1960) - Indian (uncredited)
Wild in the Country (1961) - Hank Tyler (uncredited)
Blue Hawaii (1961) - Party Guest (uncredited)
Follow That Dream (1962) - Bank Guard (uncredited)
Kid Galahad (1962) - Opponent (uncredited)
Girls! Girls! Girls! (1962) - Bongo-Playing Crewman on Tuna Boat (uncredited)
Two for the Seesaw (1962) - Party Guest (uncredited)
It Happened at the World's Fair (1963) - Fred (uncredited)
Palm Springs Weekend (1963) - Card Player (uncredited)
Viva Las Vegas (1964) - Son of Lone Star State (uncredited)
Shock Treatment (1964) - Orderly (uncredited)
The Americanization of Emily (1964) - Soldier (uncredited)
Roustabout (1964) - Carnival Worker (uncredited)
John Goldfarb, Please Come Home! (1965) - Football Player (uncredited)
Girl Happy (1965) - Extra in Kit Kat Club (uncredited)
Tickle Me (1965) - Mabel's Boyfriend (uncredited)
Harum Scarum (1965) - Assassin (uncredited)
Paradise, Hawaiian Style (1966) - Rusty (uncredited)
The Navy vs. the Night Monsters (1966) - Navy Fireman (uncredited)
Spinout (1966) - Shorty's Pit Crew (uncredited)
Clambake (1967) - Ice Cream Vendor (uncredited)
Live a Little, Love a Little (1968) - Newspaper Vendor (uncredited)
Walking Tall (1973) - Sheriff Tanner
Framed (1975) - Mallory
Walking Tall Part II (1975) - Sheriff Tanner
 Angel City (1980) Sud
Road House (1989)  - Red Webster
Trapper County War (1989) - George
The Legend of Grizzly Adams (1990) - Bodine
Raw Nerve (1991) - Dave
Prey of the Chameleon (1992) - Pritchard
The Gun in Betty Lou's Handbag (1992) - Judge
Natural Born Killers (1994) - Cowboy Sheriff
Felony (1994) - Chief Edwards
The Expert (1995) - Judge
Her Hidden Truth (1995, TV Movie) - Fireman Leon Sykes
The P.A.C.K. (1997) - Sheriff Charlie Stone
The Rainmaker (1997) - Buddy Black
I Still Know What You Did Last Summer (1998) - Paulsen
Cookie's Fortune (1999) - Mr. Henderson
Above Suspicion (2000) - Officer Ward
Woman's Story (2000) - Judge Ewing
Vampires Anonymous (2003) - Tom Miller
Forty Shades of Blue (2005) - Duigan
Glory Road (2006) - Ross Moore
Goodbye Solo (2008) - William
Father of Invention (2010) - Sam Bergman
The Black Dove (2012) - Detective Randall Hayward
At Any Price (2012) - Cliff Whipple
Safe Haven (2013) - Roger

References

External links

1936 births
2017 deaths
American male film actors
American stunt performers
American male television actors
Songwriters from Tennessee
Male actors from Memphis, Tennessee
Humes High School alumni
Elvis Presley
Deaths from aortic aneurysm